WWLX (590 AM) is a radio station broadcasting a variety hits format, Licensed to Lawrenceburg, Tennessee, United States, the station is currently owned by Prospect Communications.

WWLX was a simulcast of sister station WLLX until August 2008 when it was re-branded as "Classic Hits WLX" and launched with a network of FM translators that cover Southern Middle Tennessee.  In July 2014 Classic Hits WLX was re-launched as "105.3 The X" with a revised classic rock music format in addition to local sports coverage. On May 1, 2016 WWLX switched to a simulcast of country-formatted WLLX.

Previous logo

References

External links

WLX